Semecarpus pubescens, the velvet badulla, is a species of plant in the family Anacardiaceae. It is endemic to Sri Lanka.

References

Endemic flora of Sri Lanka
pubescens
Vulnerable plants
Taxonomy articles created by Polbot